Folktales is the second studio album released by the rock and roll jam band The Big Wu.

Track listing
  "Angie O'Plasty"
  "Minnesota Moon"
  "Boxing Day"
  "Two Person Chair"
  "Oxygen"
  "Elani"
  "Kensington Manor"
  "House of Wu"
  "S.O.S."
  "Shantytown"

2000 albums
The Big Wu albums